Liancheng Jinhe is an under construction metro station on the Wanda–Zhonghe–Shulin line located in Zhonghe, New Taipei, Taiwan. The station is scheduled to open at the end of 2025.

Station overview 
The station will be a two-level, underground station with an island platform. The station will demonstrate the power of industrial transformation based on the "industrial movement."

Originally, the name of this station was planned to be "Shuang-Ho Hospital Station." However, after considering that this station has a distance of 600 meters from Shuang-Ho Hospital, it was decided that the name of the station be changed to Liancheng Jinhe. The station name originates from the location of the station, at Liancheng Jinhe Intersection.

Station layout

References 

Wanda–Zhonghe–Shulin line stations
Standard gauge railways in Taiwan
Railway stations scheduled to open in 2025